Little Things is the second album by Sylver, released in April 2003.

"Livin' My Life", "Why Worry" and "Shallow Waters" were the first three singles released from the album. The fourth single, "Wild Horses" was only released in Belgium.

Track listing
"Livin' My Life" (4:00)
"Why Worry" (3:00)
"Shallow Water" (3:30)
"Wild Horses" (4:00)
"Confused" (3:30)
"So Afraid" (4:30)
"Weeping Willows" (6:00)
"Never Ever" (4:00)
"Heal My Heart" (6:00)
"Little Things" (3:00)
"Je Ne Sais Pas" (4:30) - hidden track

Charts

References

Sylver albums
2003 albums
Urban Records albums